Springett is a surname. Notable people with the surname include:

Caroline Emma Springett (born 1998), Thai model and actress
Peter Springett (1946–1997), English footballer
Robert Springett (born 1962), British Anglican bishop
Ron Springett (1935–2015), English footballer
Victor George Springett (1916–1990), Australian politician

See also
Springett Penn (disambiguation), multiple people